Maksim Cikuli (born 7 January 1952) was the Minister of Health of Albania two times. His most recent term of office was from September 2005 until March 2007.

Cikuli is a doctor who has specialized in genetics.

References 

21st-century Albanian politicians
1952 births
Living people
Government ministers of Albania
Health ministers of Albania
20th-century Albanian physicians
20th-century Albanian politicians